Anna Smashnova was the defending champion and successfully defended her title, by defeating Lourdes Domínguez Lino 6–1, 6–3 in the final. This was Smashnova's final WTA singles title before her retirement in 2007.

Seeds

Draw

Finals

Top half

Bottom half

References

External links
 Official results archive (ITF)
 Official results archive (WTA)

Tippmix Budapest Grand Prix - Singles
Budapest Grand Prix